Rodrigo Contreras (born 27 October 1995 in Tucumán), better known as Tucu, is an Argentine footballer who plays as a striker for Liga Profesional club Platense.

Honours

Argentina U20
South American Youth Football Championship: 2015

References

External links
 

1995 births
Living people
Argentine footballers
Argentine expatriate footballers
2015 South American Youth Football Championship players
Association football forwards
San Lorenzo de Almagro footballers
Club de Gimnasia y Esgrima La Plata footballers
S.C. Braga B players
Quilmes Atlético Club footballers
Arsenal de Sarandí footballers
C.D. Antofagasta footballers
Club Necaxa footballers
Aldosivi footballers
Defensa y Justicia footballers
Chilean Primera División players
Argentine Primera División players
Liga Portugal 2 players
Liga MX players
Argentine expatriate sportspeople in Chile
Argentine expatriate sportspeople in Portugal
Argentine expatriate sportspeople in Mexico
Expatriate footballers in Chile
Expatriate footballers in Portugal
Expatriate footballers in Mexico
Sportspeople from Tucumán Province